The Western crested loach, Paracobitis malapterura is a species of stone loach endemic to Euphrates and Tigris river systems.

References

malapterura
Fish of the Middle East
Taxa named by Achille Valenciennes
Fish described in 1846